Ashe v. Swenson, 397 U.S. 436 (1970), was a decision by the United States Supreme Court, which held that "when an issue of ultimate fact has once been determined by a valid and final judgment, that issue cannot again be litigated between the same parties in any future lawsuit." The Double Jeopardy Clause prevents a state from relitigating a question already decided in favor of a defendant at a previous trial. Here, the guarantee against double jeopardy enforceable through the Fifth Amendment provided that where the defendant was acquitted of robbing one victim, the government could not prosecute the criminal defendant in a second trial for a different victim in the same robbery.

Bob Fred Ashe, who was one of four masked individuals charged with the armed robbery of six poker players, was indicted on six separate counts of armed robbery. At trial, a jury returned a general verdict of not guilty "due to insufficient evidence."  Six weeks later, Ashe was brought to trial for the robbery of a second poker player. At the conclusion of the trial, Ashe was found guilty and sentenced to thirty-five years. The Missouri Supreme Court affirmed the conviction, holding no former jeopardy violation.

After the federal district court denied habeas corpus relief, the Eighth Circuit Court of Appeals affirmed. The Supreme Court, however, granted certiorari and concluded from the record of the prior trial that the "single rationally conceivable issue in dispute before the jury was whether [Ashe] had been one of the robbers. And the jury by its verdict found that he had not. The federal rule of law, therefore, would make a second prosecution for the robbery . . . wholly impermissible."

Because the first jury, by  its verdict, had rejected the claim that Ashe was one of the robbers, the Supreme Court held that the State could not "constitutionally hail him before a new jury to litigate that issue again."

See also
List of United States Supreme Court cases, volume 397
Waller v. Florida (1970)

Further reading

External links

United States Supreme Court decisions that overrule a prior Supreme Court decision
United States Supreme Court cases
United States Double Jeopardy Clause case law
1970 in United States case law
United States Supreme Court cases of the Burger Court